Euthyprosopiella is a genus of parasitic flies in the family Tachinidae.

Species
Euthyprosopiella mendocina Blanchard, 1963

Distribution
Argentina.

References

Tachinidae

Diptera of South America
Dexiinae
Tachinidae genera
Fauna of Argentina
Taxa named by Émile Blanchard
Monotypic Brachycera genera